Natthaphong Samana (born 29 June 1984), is a Thai professional footballer who last played as a left back for Thai League 2 club Chiangmai United. Natthaphong has also played for Thai Premier League rivals Krung Thai Bank FC in 2004 to 2006. He played for the Thailand national football team.

International career

International

International goals

Honours

Club
Chonburi 
 Thai Premier League
  Champions (1) : 2007
 Thai FA Cup 
  Winners (1) : 2010
 Kor Royal Cup 
  Winners (4) : 2008, 2009, 2010, 2011

International
Thailand U-23
 Sea Games 
  Gold Medal (1) ; 2007

Thailand
 ASEAN Football Championship 
  Runner-up (2) : 2007, 2008

References

External links
 Profile at Goal
 N. Samana at Soccerway

1984 births
Living people
Natthaphong Samana
Natthaphong Samana
Association football wingers
Natthaphong Samana
Natthaphong Samana
Natthaphong Samana
Natthaphong Samana
Natthaphong Samana
2007 AFC Asian Cup players
Footballers at the 2006 Asian Games
Southeast Asian Games medalists in football
Natthaphong Samana
Competitors at the 2007 Southeast Asian Games
Natthaphong Samana